L7 or L-7 may refer to:

Music
 L7 (band), a grunge/metal band from Los Angeles, California
 L7 (album), a 1988 album by the band
 L-Seven, a post-punk band from Detroit, Michigan

Mathematics and technology
 L7, the application layer in the OSI model of computer communications
 A layer 7 switch or load balancer
 The Lp space for p=7 in mathematics

Transportation

Vehicles
 D-Lieferwagen L-7, a 1927–1930 German three-wheel truck
 IM L7, a 2022–present Chinese full-size luxury electric sedan
 Landsat 7, an Earth observation satellite
 Royal Ordnance L7, a tank gun

Other
 L7, IATA code for Laoag International Airlines

Other uses
 L7 (machine gun), a Belgian 7.62 mm general-purpose machine gun
 Motorola SLVR L7, a mobile phone

See also
 7L (disambiguation)
 Bustin' Out of L Seven, an album by Rick James